The following is a list of major composers by nationality:

 Chronological list of American classical composers
 Chronological list of Argentine classical composers
 Chronological list of Armenian classical composers
 Chronological list of Australian classical composers
 Chronological list of Austrian classical composers
 Chronological list of Belgian classical composers
 Chronological list of Brazilian classical composers
 Chronological list of Bulgarian classical composers
 Chronological list of Canadian classical composers
 Chronological list of Czech classical composers
 Chronological list of English classical composers
 Chronological list of French classical composers
 Chronological list of German classical composers
 Chronological list of Irish classical composers
 Chronological list of Italian classical composers
 Chronological list of Korean classical composers
 Chronological list of Russian classical composers
 Chronological list of Spanish classical composers